Ligat Ha'Al (Hebrew: ליגת העל בכדוריד) is the top Israeli professional handball league. The league is sponsored by Winner Corporation since 2010 and known also as Ligat Winner. Founded in 1954, the league currently consists of 12 teams and managed by the Israel Handball Association. Maccabi Rehovot was the first team to win the championship, while Hapoel Rishon Lezion is most successful club with 18 titles over the years. The league games are broadcast by Sport 5 channel.

History
The league was established in 1954–55 with 10 teams competing in a double round-robin tournament, and with Maccabi Rehovot winning the first three championships. At first, all matches were played as Field handball, with 11 players on the field, before reverting to 7-players handball, with the last matches being held on football fields were held in 1963. Until the 1980s, the handball in Israel was centered in places such as Rehovot, Ramat Gan and Petah Tikva, as 7 clubs played in these cities. But starting in the 1980s, the hegemony moved to Rishon Lezion, as local Maccabi won three titles in a row between 1984 and 1986. Important clubs like Hapoel Rehovot were dissolved because of financial issues. The three cities which were very successful in the Israeli handball, Rehovot, Ramat Gan and Petah Tikva, deteriorated.

Through all the 1990s, Hapoel Rishon indisputably dominated the league and won 9 championship in a row. They enjoyed from the dissolution of the Soviet Union and Yugoslavia and signed a lot of players who were famous in Europe such as Igor Bialik, Leonid Bernstein, Evgeni Oleinik and more. In 2002 Hapoel lost the championship to ASA Tel Aviv. One year later Hapoel won it again but the hegemony and the full domination in the handball ended when Maccabi Rishon with the notable head coach Gilad Maor grew stronger. Maccabi Rishon won their first championship in the new age in 2004, after they won ASA Tel Aviv in the final. Since then, for ten years, the championship stayed in Rishon Lezion and moved between Maccabi and Hapoel.

A lot of famous Israeli players played in the league, while the most famous is Idan Maimon, the all-time best Israeli player, with more than 3,500 goals. Other famous players: Doron Dayan, Amir Popko, Danny Turkenitz, Shlomo Hofman, Dudi Balsar, Harel Moritz, Akiva Lefler, Eyal Shur, Shachar Haber, Eitan Madmoni, Oleg Butenko, Benny Ne'eman Yoav Ne'eman, Chen Pomeranz and Avishay Smoler.

In 2013–14, Maccabi Tel Aviv won its first ever championship and it was the first time in 12 years that the championship moved away from Rishon Lezion. In 2014–15, Hapoel Rishon won an historic double after defeating Maccabi Rishon in the finals of Ligat Winner and State Cup. One year later, it was Maccabi Tel Aviv who won the national championship.

Administration and structure

Teams 
There are currently 12 teams in Ligat Ha'Al, as of 2016–17 season:

Season 
• A regular season of two rounds: 12 teams play in the league, competing in a double round-robin tournament. After the end of the regular season, the top 8 teams compete for the championship, with the top four teams being seeded.

• Playoffs semi-final: The teams which won a best-of-three series in the quarter-finals will qualify to the semi-finals. The winner in the series between the 1st place and the 8th place play against the winner in the series between the 4th and the 5th places. The winner in the series between the 2nd and the 7th places, play against the winner of the series between the 3rd and 6th places. In case of a draw in one of the matches, the tie is decided on goal difference with a 10 minutes extra time being played if the goal difference is equal. The home-court advantage is always given to the team that is ranked higher in the table of the regular season.

• Playoffs final: The final playoffs round is decided by a best-of-five series between the two semi-final winners. The higher-ranked team at the end of the regular season host the 1st, 3rd and 5th games of the series. A team wins three games is the national champion. If the two teams win in two games each, and the fifth games ends in a draw, the tie is decided on goal difference with a 10 minutes extra time being played if the goal difference is equal.

• Relegations: The bottom 4 teams compete in a single round-robin tournament to avoid relegation, with the bottom club relegating to Liga Leumit and the 10th and 11th placed teams compete in promotion/relegation playoffs against the 2nd and 3rd placed teams from Liga Leumit.

Sponsorships 
In the 2000s the league was sponsored by Bank Yahav and called "Ligat Bank Yahav". Later in 2010, Winner Corporation signed a sponsorship contract with the league and the league name has been changed to "Ligat Winner".

Champions
The complete list of the Israeli handball champions since 1955.

See also
 Israeli Women's Handball League

References

External links
Israel Handball Association

League
Israel
Handball
Sports leagues established in 1954
1954 establishments in Israel
Professional sports leagues in Israel